Paulo Costanzo (born September 21, 1978) is a Canadian actor. He is best known for playing Aximili-Esgarrouth-Isthill (Ax) in the TV series Animorphs, the roles of Rubin Carver in the comedy film Road Trip, Alexander Cabot in Josie and the Pussycats, Michael Tribbiani in the NBC sitcom Joey, Evan R. Lawson in the USA Network series Royal Pains, and Lyor Boone in the ABC political drama Designated Survivor.

Early life
Costanzo was born in Brampton, Ontario. His mother is a singer-songwriter and his father an artist of Italian descent.

Career

In 2004, Costanzo was cast in the role of Joey Tribbiani's nephew in the Friends''' spinoff Joey, which he played over both seasons.

In 2017, he was cast in a series regular role in the second season of ABC's Designated Survivor as White House political director Lyor Boone.

In 2022, Costanzo appeared in the role of Matteo in the second season of Amazon's comedy series Upload''.

Selected filmography

Film

Television

Video games

References

External links
 

1978 births
Male actors from Ontario
Canadian male film actors
Canadian male television actors
Canadian male voice actors
Canadian people of Italian descent
Living people
People from Brampton